Baudrit is a surname. Notable people with the surname include:

Fernando Baudrit Solera (1907–1975), Costa Rican jurist
Lore Baudrit (born 1991), French ice hockey player

See also
Baudri